Ryan "Gamble" Roulette (born March 8, 1986) is an American professional stock car racing driver. His professional racing debut occurred in the ARCA Menards Series West in 2021, driving the No. 77 for Performance P-1 Motorsports based out of southern California. He is currently planning to run the ARCA Menards Series West full-time in 2023 through his self-owned team in the No. 22 Ford.

Racing career

Early Racing Career 
Roulette has been racing across the United States over the past 15+ years. He has been seen at multiple dirt oval tracks racing in Karts, 4-Cylinder Mini Stocks, Mini Sprint, B-Mods, Legends Car Racing, Midget Car Racing, and Sprint Car Racing (both Wing and Non-wing). He also has some time behind the wheel on a Road Course in Sports Car Racing at the Nürburgring, and asphalt oval track racing in a Pro Late Model at Madera Speedway in Madera, California.

ARCA Menards Series 
Roulette would first sign with Performance P-1 Motorsports to race the No. 77 Toyota Camry at the 2021 Arizona Lottery 100 in Phoenix Raceway. Roulette would eventually finish 28th due to reported issues with the car and growing pains with the team. Last year in 2022, Roulette would sign with Last Chance Racing and race the No. 85 Toyota Camry at the General Tire 150 in Phoenix Raceway. Now in 2023, Roulette has taken on a new role as owner/driver of the No. 22 Ford Fusion and will make his start his season in the General Tire 150 at Phoenix Raceway.

Personal life 
Along with racing, Roulette is a United States Air Force pilot.

Motorsports career results

ARCA Menards Series
(key) (Bold – Pole position awarded by qualifying time. Italics – Pole position earned by points standings or practice time. * – Most laps led.)

ARCA Menards Series East

ARCA Menards Series West 
(key) (Bold – Pole position awarded by qualifying time. Italics – Pole position earned by points standings or practice time. * – Most laps led.)

References

External links 

 
 Official website

1996 births
Living people
ARCA Menards Series drivers
NASCAR drivers
Racing drivers from Iowa
Sportspeople from Iowa